Neofaculta taigana is a moth in the family Gelechiidae. It was described by Ponomarenko in 1998. It is found in the Russian Far East and Hokkaido in Japan.

The wingspan is 21-22.5 mm. The forewings are dark-grey, almost black, with an indistinct black dot on the middle and five to six concolorous dots along the apex and external margin. The hindwings are grey.

References

Chelariini
Moths described in 1998